"For Island Fires and Family" is a song by Irish singer-songwriter and musician Dermot Kennedy. It was released as a single on 4 January 2019. The song features on his compilation album Dermot Kennedy. The song peaked at number 36 on the Irish Singles Chart.

Background
The song has been a fan favourite. Kennedy tweeted, "I wanted to start the new year by bringing together all the songs you've been singing back to me in one collection. As well as that, right now I want to share 'For Island Fires and Family' with you. This song is hugely important to me, and I've been so excited to release it."

Kennedy disclosed in an interview the meaning of the popular lyric, “Now when I’m face to face with death I’ll grab his throat and ask him, ‘How does it hurt?’.” He states that loss is inevitable. No matter the circumstance and no matter the quality of life that is lived, nothing gets by death. In this song, Kennedy wanted to take control of that notion, and in reverse, take control of death.

Music video
A music video to accompany the release of "For Island Fires and Family" was first released onto YouTube on 10 January 2019.

Personnel
Credits adapted from Tidal.
 Carey Willetts – producer, associated performer, bass, drum programming, engineer, mixer, piano, studio personnel, synthesizer
 Dermot Kennedy – composer, lyricist, acoustic guitar, associated performer
 Amy Jane Hosken – associated performer, viola, violin
 Chris Gehringer – mastering engineer, studio personnel

Charts

Release history

References

2019 songs
2019 singles
Dermot Kennedy songs
Songs written by Dermot Kennedy